Vojáček (feminine Vojáčková) is a Czech surname, being a diminutive of the word voják (soldier). Notable people with the name include:

 Jan Vojáček, Czech footballer
 Kateřina Vojáčková, Czech snowboarder
 Rostislav Vojáček, Czech footballer

See also
Wojaczek, Polish version of the surname

Czech-language surnames